The Weak-End Party is a 1922 American film featuring Stan Laurel.

Cast
 Stan Laurel as The gardener
 Marion Aye as Lily, the birthday girl
 Harry L. Rattenberry as Mr. Smith, her father
 Otto Fries as The overseer
 Colin Kenny asMonocle Charley
 Scotty MacGregor as Pinkerton Burns (as Scott MacGregor)
 Babe London as Party guest

See also
 List of American films of 1922

External links

1922 films
American silent short films
1922 short films
American black-and-white films
Films directed by Broncho Billy Anderson
1922 comedy films
Silent American comedy films
American comedy short films
1920s American films